Karjolsteinen (The Carriage Stone) is a Norwegian drama film from 1977. The film was directed by Knut Andersen based on a novel by Sigbjørn Hølmebakk with the same name.

Plot 
The radical author Olav Klungeland feels divided and inadequate both as a writer, as a politician, and as a fellow human being. He gradually becomes more acquainted with a former priest, Eilif Grøtteland, who comes from a small place in the southwest and lives in a hotel in Oslo at the same time as his wife is in the hospital, sick with cancer. On a rainy April night, the two young men are sitting in the hotel room. The older man tells the younger one about his life, from his childhood in small conditions further south in the country, through his youth and as a young man at the same time as he worked as a priest in Finnmark. 

In the postwar period, the priest's own brother Lars was affected by the treason settlement, and indirectly himself. A gnawing doubt hits him, undermining the love of his wife Elna and their daughter Lillian. The meeting between this priest and the young author will soon prove to be of decisive importance for both of their further lives. During a celebration on May 1, the author Olav is expected to give a fiery speech about the liberating power of socialism. The older man's account makes up most of the story, about his encounters with various people that have meant a lot to his development and attitudes.

Cast
 Erik Øksnes as Olav Klungland
 Marit Grønhaug as Vigdis
 Sverre Anker Ousdal as Eilif
 Are Sjaastad as Eilif (as a child)
 Grethe Ryen as Elna
 Siri Hølmebakk as Elna (as a child)
 Arne Lindtner Næss as Lars
 Arne Lendl as Lars (as a child)
 Rolf Søder as Arnold
 Roy Bjørnstad as the party chairman
 Frimann Falck Clausen as Jens Heimdal
 Maryon Eilertsen as Lillian
 Harald Heide Steen as Didrik
 Thorleif Reiss as the judge

References

External links
 Filmweb.no: Karjolsteinen

Norwegian drama films
Films directed by Knut Andersen
1970s Norwegian-language films
1977 films
1977 drama films